Lörrach is a town in southwest Germany, in the valley of the Wiese, close to the French and the Swiss borders. It is the capital of the district of Lörrach in Baden-Württemberg. It is the home of a number of large employers, including the Milka chocolate factory owned by Mondelez International. The city population has grown over the last century, with only 10,794 in 1905, it has now increased its population to 49,382.

Nearby is the castle of Rötteln on the Wiesental, whose lords became the counts of Hachberg and a residence of the Margraves of Baden; this was destroyed by the troops of Louis XIV in 1678, but was rebuilt in 1867. Lörrach received market rights in 1403, but it did not obtain the privileges of a city until 1682.

After the Napoleonic epoch, the town was included in the Grand Duchy of Baden. On 21 September 1848, Gustav Struve attempted to start a revolutionary uprising in Lörrach as part of the Revolutions of 1848–49. It failed, and Struve was caught and imprisoned. Still, Lörrach was officially the capital of Germany for a day.

Geography
Lörrach is located in the southernmost part of the Rhine Rift valley. The depression is created by tectonic movements, and the area has a high earthquake risk.
Several times a year, Lörrach is afflicted by slight and medial earthquakes.

The city is located in a valley of the Quaternary period. Lörrach is surrounded by slopes on two sides. The slopes create the southern part of the Wiesental, that is the valley where the Wiese river flows.

Geographical locations of the subdistrict Lörrach:
 Elevation of the deepest place: 272 m (in the valley Wiesental at the border with Switzerland)
 Elevation of the highest place: 570 m (in the forest of Rötteln)

The extent of the urban area from south to north is 6.0 km and from east to west 4.6 km.
Lörrach is also the capital city of Markgräflerland and a part of the tri-national agglomeration area of Basel (Switzerland). Stuttgart is 220 km away from Lörrach, and it takes one hour to drive to Bern or Zürich. The city has several forested hills along the valley Wiesental: Schädelberg, Homburg, Röttler Wald, and Tüllinger Berg.

Lörrach is bounded by many municipalities and the city of Riehen (Switzerland). In addition, it is located in the foothills of the Black Forest and on the border of Switzerland.

Climate
Lörrach's climate is mild, and in the summer, it is often hot. The region of Markgräflerland is the warmest in Germany because of the Mediterranean air current from the valley of the Rhône. Because of its numerous sunny days, the region is dubbed the German Tuscany (German: Die Toskana Deutschlands).

Boroughs and districts

Lörrach is subdivided into three boroughs and three districts. In sum, the three boroughs have an area of 18.6 km2.

The three districts have their own administrations with a chief magistrate (Ortsvorsteher). Every five years, the citizens of Lörrach elect the council of the districts. The satellite city Salzert was developed in 1963. Inzlingen, close to Lörrach, is an independent municipality, but Lörrach oversees its administration.

History

Population development

 source: Statistisches Landesamt Stuttgart, Statistischer Jahresbericht der Stadt Lörrach.

Coat of arms

Lörrach received its city rights in 1682 when it became the capital of the Oberamt Rötteln-Sausenberg. At the same time, its arms were granted. The arms show a canting lark (Lerche). In 1756, both the city rights and the arms were regranted by Margrave Charles Frederick of Baden. The colours are also the colours of Baden. Even though the arms have not changed since, the shape and size of the lark have changed considerably. The present arms have been used since the early 1960s and show a very modern variation of the lark. After municipal reforms, the coat of arms was reconfirmed on 11 November 1975.

Religion

Christianity:

Lörrach initially belonged to the diocese of Konstanz and was under the archdiocese of Breisgau. In 1529, after the Reformation had been introduced there, the parsonage of Lörrach was occupied from Basel. The reformation in the city was introduced in 1556. After that, Lörrach was for many centuries a predominantly Protestant city. In Rötteln, an archdiocese had existed since the beginning of the 15th century, which at the end of the 17th century, shifted to Lörrach. The Protestant pastor of Lörrach was from 1682 an intendant, too. The Stadtkirche is the main church of Lörrach (first mentioned in the 12th century). In addition, Lörrach has a few parishes: Johannespfarrei (founded in the 20th century), Pauluspfarrei for the northern city (founded in 1906), Matthäuspfarrei for the eastern city, Inzlingen (founded in 1949), Markuspfarrei (founded in 1956), Salzertgemeinde (founded in 1969), and Friedensgemeinde for the district of Homburg (founded in 1974).

The borough of Stetten was controlled by Austria until 1803. Therefore, Stetten has a Catholic tradition, although the reformation had been introduced years before. Because of a contract with Austria, Stetten again became Catholic. At first, the parish of Stetten also served the resident Catholics of Lörrach. They held their church services in the new church, the Fridolinskirche (1822). The original church of Stettens was founded in the 13th century. Between 1864 and 1867 in Lörrach, its own parish church (St. Bonifatius) was built, at which a curacy was created that was raised to the status of a parsonage in 1882. A second Catholic church (St. Peter) was built in 1964. In Brombach, they had already built in 1900 a church (St. Josephskirche), which has been a parsonage since 1911. All Catholic parishes of Lörrach today form together with the neighbouring parishes of St. Peter and Paul in Inzlingen a group pastoral ministry within the deanery of Wiesental belonging to the archbishopric Freiburg.

Today, a slight predominance of the Lutheran denomination exists. In the borough of Stetten exists a relative Catholic majority.

Beside the two large churches, some parishes belong to free churches. For example, the Freie evangelische Gemeinde or FeG Lörrach (English: Free Evangelical community).

Politics

Political proportion 

The municipal council of Lörrach consists of 32 volunteer aldermen and alderwomen, whose chairman is the Oberbürgermeisterin (mayor). The municipal council is elected for a period of five years by the citizenry.

The last election from 13 June 2004 had a percentage of voting of 41.2% and resulted in the following allocation of seats in the city hall of Lörrach:

Source: (1) Kommunale Unabhängige Liste (English: Municipal autonomous list)
* variance to the municipal council elections of 1999.

Heads of city
The chronicle of Lörrach reports of a Johann von Schallbach in the year 1366 as the first Vogt. The office designation of mayor was reserved for the local chiefs of the cities. The first mayor of Lörrach was Marx Christoph Leibfried, who took office in 1882, the year of the first German town law of the city. He was employed by the Markgraf. Since 1956, the city head is the Oberbürgermeister, who is selected directly by the citizens.

Mayors since 1804

Source: 
* Oberbürgermeister

Economics and infrastructure
The town supports approximately 18,300 jobs. Retailers gained a business volume of 342.7 million euros in the year 2004. Approximately a fifth of this business volume was generated by customers from Switzerland.

Transport

Bundesautobahn 98 passes Lörrach. Thereby it has a direct connection to the Bundesautobahn 5 and to the A35 autoroute in France. The A2 motorway and the A3 motorway of Switzerland are also near Lörrach. The Bundesstraße B 317, from Titisee-Neustadt across the pass of the Feldberg, is the most important arterial road of the city. The Bundesstraße 317 is interrupted by Switzerland. At present the B 317 is built through the Swiss territory as duty-free road.

The principal railway station in Lörrach is Lörrach Hauptbahnhof, with frequent service provided by the Basel S-Bahn. There are a half-dozen other stations within the municipality. There is also a terminal where car drivers can travel together with their cars by train. The terminal connects Lörrach with Hildesheim, Bremen, Hamburg and Berlin. From 1919 to 1939 as well as from 1947 to 1967 Line 6 of the tram of Basel operated as the urban tram of Lörrach. Lörrach has some local and regional bus connections. The nearest international airport, the EuroAirport Basel-Mulhouse-Freiburg, is 14 km away from Lörrach.

Administrative bodies, organisations and courts
Lörrach as a district accommodates the district administration office and a highway maintenance depot. Lörrach has several schools of all school types plus a Folk high school, a municipal library with over 65,000 books, a scientific regional library, a school of music, and two other smaller libraries. The local court of Lörrach is responsible for cities and municipalities in the district. Furthermore, there is a labour court in Lörrach, which constitutes the first jurisdiction for the districts of Lörrach and Waldshut. In addition there are three Superior Courts of Justice in Radolfzell am Bodensee. Lörrach also has a tax office, a labour office, a motorway police (German: Autobahnpolizei), and a criminal investigation department. Lörrach's hospital opened on 1 October 1845, at that time as an urban infirmary. On 1 January 1994 the three hospitals of Lörrach, Rheinfelden, and Schopfheim were pooled into a GmbH. Today the hospital of Lörrach has 351 beds.

Companies in Lörrach
One of the most well-known companies and employers in Lörrach is the chocolate manufacturer Mondelez Deutschland GmbH & Co. KG, well known for the brand of chocolate confectionary Milka and Suchard. Lörrach was the home of the GABA Deutschland GmbH, a pharmaceutical company that produced the famous elmex, meridol and aronal toothpaste. Colgate-Palmolive acquired Gaba's parent company Gaba Holding AG in 2004 and closed down the Lörrach-based factory in 2012.

Other companies of note:
 KBC Fashion GmbH & Co. KG, textile finishing company
 Tally Weijl Retail Germany GmbH, the German arm of the Basel based fashion label
 A. Raymond GmbH & Co. KG, the German arm of the international enginnering group
 Streck Transportges. mbH, Transport & Logisitcs company
 Midro Lörrach GmbH, pharmaceutical company
 Migros, headquarters of Migros Germany
 Brauerei Lasser GmbH, brewery with 70 employees

Media

Print media 
Two daily newspapers are based in Lörrach and have a local editorial office: Badische Zeitung and Die Oberbadische. Die Oberbadische (formerly Oberbadisches Volksblatt), published in the city, is Lörrach's oldest newspaper (founded 1885). In addition the Oberbadische Verlagshaus publishes the two newspapers Weiler Zeitung und Markgräfler Tagblatt. The city magazine Puls is published monthly and reports on events in and around Lörrach.

Broadcast and television 
The radio programme of Südwestrundfunk has a regional office in Lörrach. There they produce parts of the radio program SWR4 Baden-Württemberg.

Culture
Lörrach is the home to an annual voice festival (Stimmen) that takes place in early summer, in 2010 from 14 July to 8 August. The festival has many venues in and around Lörrach including Weil am Rhein. The motto of the festival is "Passion that sounds" (German: Leidenschaft, die klingt) (alternate translation: "Passion you can hear"). The festival exists since 1994.

Twin towns – sister cities

Lörrach is twinned with:
 Sens, France (1966)
 Senigallia, Italy (1986)
 Village-Neuf, France (1988)
 Meerane, Germany (1990)
 Chester, United Kingdom (2002)

Annually, numerous meetings and exchanges between schools and associations take place. The Hebel Gymnasium School in Lörrach takes part in an annual school exchange with The Mountbatten School in Romsey, England. With Vyshhorod in the Ukraine exists a friendly connection. In 2004 Loerrach International was created, an association for the advancement of the partnerships between cities and international friendships. In 2005 a cultural partnership was substantiated with Edirne in Turkey.

Notable people
Gustav Hugo (1764–1807), jurist
Ferdinand Hitzig (1807–1875), biblical critic
Ottmar Hitzfeld (born 1949), football player and manager
Jörg Kachelmann (born 1958), Swiss presenter in the meteorological field
Sebastian Deisler (born 1980), footballer
Dominik Samuel Fritz (born 1983), Mayor of Timișoara
Melanie Behringer (born 1985), footballer
Christina Shakovets (born 1994), tennis player
Butrint Imeri (born 1996), Kosovo-Albanian singer

Associated with the city
Johann Peter Hebel (1760–1826), short story writer and poet
Gustav Struve (1805–1870), surgeon
Manfred G. Raupp (born 1941), agricultural scientist and economist
Marion Caspers-Merk (born 1955), politician (SPD)
Theodor Sproll (born 1957), social and economical scientist
Roland Wiesendanger (born 1961), physicist

See also
Rötteln Castle
Lörrach sculpture path

References

External links

Official website (German)
 Lörrach:History and images
Lörrach Civic Heraldry
Daily Newspaper of the area
Daily Newspaper of the area
News and musings from Weil am Rhein – German town near Loerrach on the Basle border triangle
Burg Rötteln: Picture Gallery
Burghof Cultural Event Centre and Theatre
Cultural Youth events in Loerrach
'Stimmen' Loerrach
'Metal Forces Festival' Loerrach

Lörrach (district)
Germany–Switzerland border crossings
Baden